The Multatuli Prize (in Dutch: Multatuliprijs) is a Dutch literary prize that is given every year to an author for exemplary writing in Dutch language.

Background 

The prizes were started in Amsterdam after the Second World War.

The prize is named after the acclaimed Dutch author Eduard Douwes Dekker (better known by his pen name Multatuli) and is considered to be one of the most prestigious prizes in Dutch literature.

Eligibility 

The nominated books must have been published between May 1 of the previous year and April 30 of the entry year.

Notable winners 
Past winners of the prize include:

 2002 - Paul Claes De Kameleon
 2001 - Jeroen Brouwers Geheime Kamers
 2000 - Kees 't Hart De revue
 1999 - Marie Kessels Ongemakkelijke portretten
 1998 - Dirkje Kuik Broholm
 1997 - Maria Stahlie Honderd deuren
 1996 - Rascha Peper Russisch blauw
 1995 - Tonnus Oosterhoff Het dikke hart
 1994 - Nelleke Noordervliet De naam van de vader
 1993 - Harry Mulisch De ontdekking van de hemel
 1992 - Dirk van Weelden Mobilhome
 1991 - Marita Mathijsen De geest van de dichter
 1990 - Marjolijn Februari De zonen van het uitzicht
 1989 - Armando De straat en het struikgewas
 1988 - Stefan Hertmans Gestolde wolken
 1987 - H.C. ten Berge Het geheim van een opgewekt humeur
 1986 - A.F.Th. van der Heijden De gevarendriehoek
 1985 - Cees Nooteboom In Nederland
 1984 - Armando Machthebbers
 1983 - K. Schippers Beweegredenen
 1982 - Hugo Brandt Corstius Opperlandse taal- & letterkunde
 1981 - Doeschka Meijsing Tijger
 1980 - Jeroen Brouwers Het verzonkene
 1979 - Renate Rubinstein Niets te verliezen en toch bang
 1978 - Gerrit Krol De weg naar Sacramento
 1977 - Louis Ferron De keisnijder van Fichtenwald
 1976 - Bob den Uyl Gods wegen zijn duister en zelden aangenaam
 1975 - Maarten 't Hart Het vrome volk
 1974 - Anton Koolhaas Vanwege een tere huid
 1973 - Jan Arends
 1972 - Louis Paul Boon Pieter Daens

References 

Academic awards
Dutch literary awards
Awards established in 1972
1972 establishments in the Netherlands
Awards disestablished in 2003
2003 disestablishments in the Netherlands